Estonia is a unitary country with a single-tier local government system. Local affairs are managed autonomously by local governments.

Since administrative reform in 2017, there are in total 79 local governments, including 15 towns and 64 rural municipalities. All municipalities have equal legal status and form part of a county, which is a state administrative unit. Representative body of local authorities is municipal council, elected at general direct elections for a four-year term. The council appoints local government, headed by a mayor. For additional decentralization the local authorities may form municipal districts with limited authority, currently those have been formed in Tallinn and Hiiumaa.

Separately from administrative units there are also settlement units: village, small borough, borough, and town. Generally villages have less than 300, small borough have between 300 and 1000, borough and town have over 1000 inhabitants.

Database which consists of info about Estonian administrative units and settlements, is called EHAK (abbreviation for Estonian Eesti haldus- ja asustusjaotuse klassifikaator).

Counties

  Harju County 
  Hiiu County 
  Ida-Viru County 
  Jõgeva County 
  Järva County 
  Lääne County 
  Lääne-Viru County 
  Põlva County 
  Pärnu County 
  Rapla County 
  Saare County 
  Tartu County 
  Valga County 
  Viljandi County 
  Võru County

Parishes or municipalities

See also
 Boroughs of Estonia
 Populated places in Estonia

References

Geography of Estonia